Caustis dioica is a sedge that is native to Western Australia.

The monoecious and rhizomatous perennial sedge has a tangled, tussocky habit. The plant blooms between September and December producing yellow-brown flowers.

It is found in the Mid West, Wheatbelt, South West, Great Southern and Goldfields-Esperance regions where it grows in sandy-loamy soils.

References

Plants described in 1810
Flora of Western Australia
dioica
Taxa named by Robert Brown (botanist, born 1773)